Kalthoum Sarrai كلثوم السراي in Arabic (25 September 1962 – 19 January 2010), best known as Cathy Sarrai, was a Tunisian-born French television presenter, anchorwoman and television personality.  She was known to many French and Belgian television viewers for her role in the French version of Super Nanny, which began airing on M6 on 1 February 2005.

Sarrai was born in Tunis, Tunisia, on 25 September 1962, as one of seven children. She moved to France in 1979, where she studied child psychology before pursuing a successful career as a television presenter. Sarrai also authored three books, including an autobiography.

She began appearing on the French version of Super Nanny in 2005. The show, in which she taught parents basic child care and parenting techniques, attracted 3.7 million viewers in Belgium and France, making her a familiar personality on M6.

Kalthoum Sarrai died in Paris on Tuesday 19 January 2010, of cancer at the age of 47. She was buried in Tunis.

References

External links

The death of the France’s Super Nanny - Cathy Sarraï

1962 births
2010 deaths
French television presenters
French psychologists
French women psychologists
Tunisian emigrants to France
French women writers
Tunisian writers
Writers from Tunis
Writers from Paris
French women television presenters